Toumin (also spelled Toumine) is a village in northwestern Syria, administratively part of the Hama Governorate, southwest of Hama. Nearby localities include Deir al-Fardis to the northwest, Kafr Buhum to the north, al-Rastan to the south and Houla to the southwest. According to the Central Bureau of Statistics (CBS), Toumin had a population of 2,129 in the 2004 census. Its inhabitants are predominantly Greek Orthodox Christians.

References

Bibliography

 

Populated places in Hama District
Eastern Orthodox Christian communities in Syria
Christian communities in Syria